The Military of the Goryeo Dynasty was the primary military force of the Goryeo Dynasty. During the Later Three Kingdoms Period, Wang Geom overthrew the Taebong ruler, Gung Ye, and renamed it Goryeo after the Goguryeo Dynasty. He led the kingdom's armies and navies against Silla and Later Baekje and unified the peninsula. Goryeo was able to mobilize sizable military might during times of war.

In the early period, the army was known for successfully defending the northern borders from the Khitans and the Jurchens. But the Imperial Court and the official scholars mistreated the military and overthrew the emperor, establishing a military regime that lasted a century. In the middle period, the army was also known for repelling the Mongol Empire until they capitulated after the ninth invasion, reducing the emperor to the status of king. The military regime opposed Mongol rule until the royal court overthrew them under their direction. The Sambyeolcho Army revolted against the Mongols in response until they suppressed them.

The navy was known for aiding the Mongols in invading Japan, but the Japanese defeated them, leaving the south defenseless against Wokou Pirate raids. The navy innovated gunpowder weaponry after the Mongol's use in the invasion of Japan to retrofit their ships with cannons and rockets to strengthen their naval defenses.

During the late period, King Gongmin purged Goryeo of Mongol influence and regained their sovereignty. They invaded the north, retaking some of Goguryeo's territories south of Manchuria. However, they lost them during the Red Turban Invasion of Goryeo but repelled them. However, the wars brought Goryeo to ruin, and General Yi Seong-Gye, who was ordered to attack the Ming to regain Liaodong retreated from Wihwado and overthrew the Goryeo and established the Joseon Dynasty.

History

Later Three Kingdoms Period and the War for Unification
From 889 to 935 AD, the Unified Shilla began to decline from corruption and internal strife, which led to the revival of Later Baekje and Later Goguryeo. A monk named Gung Ye founded Hugoguryeo but changed the names to Majin and Taebong in later years. Taejo's father, Wang Yung (later Sejo of Goryeo), along with many local clans, quickly surrendered to Gung Ye. Wang Geon followed his father into service under Gung Ye, the future leader of Taebong, and he began his service under Gungye's command.

In 900, he led a successful campaign against local clans and the army of Later Baekje in the Chungju area, gaining more fame and recognition from the king. In 903, he led a famous naval campaign against the southwestern coastline of Hubaekje (Keumsung, later Naju) while Gyeon Hwon was at war against Silla. He led several more military campaigns and helped conquered people living in poverty under Silla's rule. The public favored him due to his leadership and generosity. He also led Taebong's Navy, took Geumseong from the Later Baekje, renamed it Naju, and stationed the troops in 903. In 909, Wang Geon became Admiral of the Navy and led the naval forces. Gyeon Hwon captured the envoy's ship from Yeomhae County within the jurisdiction of Gwangju. That year, Wang Geon captured Jindo (珍島) and Koido (皐夷島) of the Later Baekje with 2,500 soldiers. The following year, when Gyeon Hwon threatened Naju again, Wang Geon defeated Gyeon Hwon's naval forces at the Naju port, and arrived at the port of Bannamhyeon (潘南縣), captured the pirate leader Neungchang, and sent it to Gungye to behead him. This would be Wang Geon's naval military activity before the founding of Goryeo and, at the same time, Taebong's maritime activity.

However, Gung Ye began to refer to himself as the Buddha and persecuted people who expressed their opposition to his religious arguments. He executed many monks, then later, even his wife and two sons, and the public began to turn away from him. His costly rituals and harsh rule caused even more opposition. In 918, four of his generals—Hong Yu, Bae Hyeon-gyeong, Shin Sung-gyeom and Bok Ji-gyeom—overthrew Taebong and installed Wang Geon as King Taejo.

In 927, Gyeon Hwon of Hubaekje led forces into Silla's capital, Gyeongju, capturing and executing its king, King Gyeongae. Then he established King Gyeongsun as his puppet monarch before he turned his army toward Goryeo. Hearing of the news, Taejo planned a strike with 5,000 cavalrymen to attack Gyeon's troops on the way back home at Gongsan near Daegu. He met Hubaekje forces and suffered a disastrous defeat, losing most of his army, including his generals Kim Nak and Shin Sung-gyeom, the very same man who crowned Wang as a king. However, Goryeo quickly recovered from defeat and successfully defended Hubaekje's attack on its front.

In 935, the last king of Silla, King Gyeongsun, felt there was no way to revive his kingdom and surrendered his entire land to Taejo. Taejo gladly accepted his surrender and gave him the title of prince, and accepted his daughter as one of his wives (Wang had six queens and many more wives as he married daughters of every single local leader). It caused much disgust to Gyeon Hwon. Gyeon's father, who held his claim to the Sangju region, also defected and surrendered to Goryeo and was received as the father of a king. Gyeon Hwon's oldest son, Gyeon Singeom, led a coup with his brothers Yanggeom and Yonggeom, against their father, who favored their half-brother, Geumgang, as his successor to the throne. Gyeon Hwon was sent into exile and imprisoned in Geumsansa but escaped to Goryeo and was treated like Taejo's father, who died just before his surrender.

In 936, Wang led his final campaign against Singeom of Later Baekje. Singeom fought against Taejo, but facing many disadvantages and inner conflict, he surrendered to Taejo. Wang finally occupied Hubaekje formally and unified the nation for the second time since Unified Silla; he ruled until 943.

Goryeo–Khitan War

Taejo displayed intense animosity toward the Khitans who had destroyed Balhae. The Liao dynasty sent 30 envoys with 50 camels as a gift in 942, but Wang Geon exiled the envoys and starved the camels under a bridge in retribution for Balhae, despite the major diplomatic repercussions. Taejo proposed to Gaozu of Later Jìn that they attack the Khitans as revenge for the destruction of Balhae, according to the Zizhi Tongjian. Furthermore, in his Ten Mandates to his descendants, he stated that the Khitans are no different from beasts and should be guarded against.

The "Manbu Bridge Incident" of 942 forced Goryeo to prepare itself for a conflict with the Khitan Empire: Jeongjong established a military reserve force of 300,000 soldiers called the "Resplendent Army" in 947, and Gwangjong built fortresses north of the Chongchon River, expanding toward the Yalu River. The Khitans considered Goryeo a potential threat and, with tensions rising, invaded in 993. The Koreans were defeated in their first encounter with the Khitans, but successfully defended against them at the Chongchon River. Negotiations began between the Goryeo commander, Seo Hui, and the Liao commander, Xiao Sunning. In conclusion, Goryeo entered a nominal tributary relationship with Liao, severing relations with Song, and Liao conceded the land east of the Yalu River to Goryeo. Afterward, Goryeo established the "Six Garrison Settlements East of the River" in its new territory. In 994, Goryeo proposed to Song a joint military attack on Liao, but was declined; previously, in 985, when Song had proposed a joint military attack on Liao, Goryeo had declined. For a time, Goryeo and Liao enjoyed an amicable relationship. In 996, Seongjong married a Liao princess.

As the Khitan Empire expanded and became more powerful, it demanded that Goryeo cede the Six Garrison Settlements, but Goryeo refused. In 1009, Gang Jo staged a coup d'état, assassinating Mokjong and installing Hyeonjong on the throne. In the following year, under the pretext of avenging Mokjong, Emperor Shengzong of Liao led an invasion of Goryeo with an army of 400,000 soldiers. Meanwhile, Goryeo tried to establish relations with Song but was ignored, as Song had agreed to the Chanyuan Treaty in 1005. Goryeo won the first battle against Liao, led by Yang Gyu, but lost the second battle, led by Gang Jo: the Goryeo army suffered heavy casualties and was dispersed, and many commanders were captured or killed, including Gang Jo himself. Later, Pyongyang was successfully defended, but the Liao army marched toward Kaesong. Hyeonjong, upon the advice of Gang Gam-chan, evacuated south to Naju, and shortly afterward Kaesong was attacked and sacked by the Liao army. He then sent Ha Gong-jin and Go Yeong-gi to sue for peace, with a promise that he would pay homage in person to the Liao emperor, and the Khitans, who were sustaining attacks by the regrouped Korean army and disrupted supply lines, accepted and began their withdrawal. However, the Khitans were ceaselessly attacked during their withdrawal; Yang Gyu rescued 30,000 prisoners of war, but died in battle. According to the History of Liao, the Khitans were beset by heavy rains and discarded much of their armor and weapons. According to the Goryeosa, the Khitans were attacked while crossing the Yalu River and many drowned. Afterward, Hyeonjong did not fulfill his promise to pay homage in person to the Liao emperor, and when demanded to cede the Six Garrison Settlements, he refused.

The Khitans built a bridge across the Yalu River in 1014 and attacked in 1015, 1016, and 1017: victory went to the Koreans in 1015, the Khitans in 1016, and the Koreans in 1017. In 1018, Liao launched an invasion led by Xiao Paiya, the older brother of Xiao Sunning, with an army of 100,000 soldiers. The Liao army was immediately ambushed and suffered heavy casualties: the Goryeo commander Gang Gam-chan had dammed a large tributary of the Yalu River and released the water on the unsuspecting Khitan soldiers, who were then charged by 12,000 elite cavalry. The Liao army pushed on toward Kaesong under constant enemy harassment, but shortly turned around and retreated after failing to take the well-defended capital. The retreating Liao army was intercepted by Gang Gam-chan in modern-day Kusong and suffered a major defeat, with only a few thousand soldiers escaping. Shengzong intended to invade again but faced internal opposition. In 1020, Goryeo sent tribute and Liao accepted, thus resuming nominal tributary relations. Shengzong did not demand that Hyeonjong pay homage in person or cede the Six Garrison Settlements. The only terms were a "declaration of vassalage" and the release of a detained Liao envoy. The History of Liao claims that Hyeonjong "surrendered" and Shengzong "pardoned" him, but according to Hans Bielenstein, "[s]horn of its dynastic language, this means no more than that the two states concluded peace as equal partners (formalized in 1022)". Hyeonjong kept his reign title and maintained diplomatic relations with the Song dynasty. Kaesong was rebuilt, grander than before, and, from 1033 to 1044, the Cheolli Jangseong, a wall stretching from the mouth of the Yalu River to the east coast of the Korean Peninsula, was built for defense against future invasions. Liao never invaded Goryeo again.

Goryeo-Jurchen War 
The Jurchens in the Yalu River region were tributaries of Goryeo since the reign of Wang Geon, who called upon them during the wars of the Later Three Kingdoms period, but the Jurchens switched allegiance between Liao and Goryeo multiple times, taking advantage of the tension between the two nations; posing a potential threat to Goryeo's border security, the Jurchens offered tribute to the Goryeo court, expecting lavish gifts in return. 

The Jurchens north of Goryeo had traditionally rendered tribute to the Goryeo monarchs and called Goryeo their "parent country" considering past ties between Goguryeo and its Mohe subjects, but thanks to the defeat of Liao to the Koreans in 1019, the Wanyan tribe of the Heishui Mohe unified the Jurchen tribes and gained in might, taking advantage of the power vacuum.

At the peak of its power, Goryeo contested with the rising Wanyan tribes of which Goryeo considered them as barbaric vassals descending from the Mohe people that served their Goguryeo ancestors, in the state of total war over former territories of Goguryeo and Balhae.

As the geopolitical situation began to shift in turbulence by the start of the 12th century, Goryeo unleashed two major military campaigns from 1104 to 1109 spearheaded by the ambitious King Yejong with vows of reclaiming former Goguryeo territories held by Jurchen tribes united under the progenitors of the Jin Dynasty, Wanyan Wuyashu and Aguda, with the aims of also preventing potential aggressions from the Jurchen tribes. Led by prominent generals such as Yun Gwan and Cheok Jun-gyeong, the well-trained Byeolmuban (別武班; "Special Warfare Army") of approximately 250,000 men initially succeeded in ravaging Jurchen territories and building the strategic "Nine Fortresses" (동북 9성, 東北九城) of which exact locations are still topics of debate. Following the invasion, numerous Jurchen tribes surrendered to the invading Korean forces but many stayed vigilant and resumed fierce resistance led by the Wanyan tribe, complicating the phase of the war. Despite the Koreans of Goryeo having proceeded to utilizing scorched earth tactics, the Jurchen tribes under the leadership of Wanyan Wuyashu achieved a pyrrhic victory as Goryeo considered securing the Nine Fortresses too costly albeit having the upper hand in the war. Contacted by the Jurchens of the Wanyan tribe that have tasted the bitterness as well of facing Korean forces in their homes for peace, Goryeo would eventually move on to reluctantly signing a peace agreement with the Wanyan tribe and later on cede the Nine Fortresses to Wuyashu, in return for tributes sent by the Jurchens, the full repatriation of Korean settlers, and the guarantee of nonaggression. Though the objective of reclaiming former ancestral lands failed, Goryeo managed to maintain peaceful relations with the Jin Dynasty which progress in conquering the Liao and Northern Song dynasty respectively.

During the reign of Jurchen leader Wuyashu in 1103–1113, the border between the two nations was stabilized and Korean forces withdrew from Jurchen territories, acknowledging Jurchen control over the contested region.

In 1115 the Jurchen founded the Jin dynasty, and in 1125 Jin annihilated Liao, which was Goryeo's suzerain, and started invasion of Song. In response to the circumstantial changes, Goryeo declared itself to be a tributary state of Jin in 1126. After that, peace was maintained and Jin never actually did invade Goryeo.

Military regime

Although the military founded Goryeo, its authority was in decline. In 1014, a coup occurred, but the effects of the rebellion didn't last long, only making generals discontent with the current supremacy of the civilian officers.

In addition, under the reign of King Uijong, military officers were prohibited from entering the Security Council, and even at times of state emergency, they were not allowed to assume commands. After political chaos, Uijong started to enjoy traveling to local temples and studying sutra, while a large group of civilian officers almost always accompanied him. The military officers were largely ignored and mobilized to construct temples and ponds.

At the beginning of 1170, the government of Goryeo was de facto controlled by a succession of powerful families from the warrior class, most notably the Choe family, in a military dictatorship akin to a shogunate.

In 1170, a group of army officers led by Jeong Jung-bu, Yi Ui-bang and Yi Go launched a coup d'état and succeeded. King Uijong went into exile and King Myeongjong was placed on the throne. However, effective power lay with a succession of generals who used an elite guard unit known as the Tobang to control the throne: the military rule of Goryeo had begun. In 1179, the young general Gyeong Dae-seung rose to power and began attempting to restore the monarch's full power and purge the state's corruption.

However, he died in 1183 and was succeeded by Yi Ui-min, who came from a nobi (enslaved person) background. His unrestrained corruption and cruelty led to a coup by general Choe Chung-heon, who assassinated Yi Ui-min and took supreme power in 1197. For the next 61 years, the Choe house ruled as military dictators, maintaining the Kings as puppet monarchs; Choe Chung-heon was succeeded in turn by his son Choe U, his grandson Choe Hang and his great-grandson Choe Ui.

Choe Chungheon forced Myeongjong off the throne and replaced him with King Sinjong. What was different from former military leaders was the active involvement of scholars in Choe's control, notably Prime Minister Yi Gyu-bo, who was a Confucian scholar-official. After Sinjong died, Choe forced his son to the throne as Huijong. After seven years, Huijong led a revolt but failed. Then, Choe found the pliable King Gojong instead. Although the House of Choe established strong private individuals loyal to it, continuous invasion by the Mongols ravaged the whole land, resulting in a weakened defense ability, and the power of the military regime waned.

Mongol Invasions

Fleeing from the Mongols, in 1216, the Khitans invaded Goryeo. They defeated the Korean armies multiple times, even reaching the gates of the capital and raiding deep into the south, but were dominated by Korean General Kim Chwi-ryeo who pushed them back north to Pyongan, where the remaining Khitans were finished off by allied Mongol-Goryeo forces in 1219.

Tension continued through the 12th century and into the 13th century when the Mongol invasions started. During the House of Choe's military rule, Goryeo resisted invasions by the Mongol Empire for nearly 30 years until swearing allegiance to the Mongols, with the direct dynastic rule of Goryeo monarchy.

In 1231, Mongols under Ögedei Khan invaded Goryeo following the aftermath of joint Goryeo-Mongol forces against the Khitans in 1219. The royal court moved to Ganghwado in the Bay of Gyeonggi in 1232. The military ruler of the time, Choe U, insisted on fighting back. Goryeo resisted for about 30 years but finally sued for peace in 1259.

Meanwhile, the Mongols began a campaign from 1231 to 1259 that ravaged parts of Gyeongsang and Jeolla. There were six significant campaigns: 1231, 1232, 1235, 1238, 1247, and 1253; between 1253 and 1258, the Mongols under Möngke Khan's general Jalairtai Qorchi launched four devastating invasions against Korea at tremendous cost to civilian lives throughout the Korean peninsula.

Civilian resistance was strong, and the Imperial Court at Ganghwa attempted to strengthen its fortress. Korea won several victories, but the Korean military could not withstand the waves of invasions. The repeated Mongol attacks caused havoc, loss of human lives, and famine in Korea. In 1236, Gojong ordered the recreation of the Tripitaka Koreana, which was destroyed during the 1232 invasion. This collection of Buddhist scriptures took 15 years to carve on 81,000 wooden blocks and is still preserved.

In March 1258, the dictator Choe Ui was assassinated by Kim Jun after which authority was restored to the monarchy and peace was made with the Mongols; however, power struggles continued in the court, and military rule did not end until 1270. Thus, dictatorship by his military group was ended, and the scholars who had insisted on peace with Mongolia gained power. Goryeo was never conquered by the Mongols, but exhausted after decades of fighting, Goryeo sent Crown Prince Wonjong to the Yuan capital to swear allegiance to the Mongols; Kublai Khan accepted, and married one of his daughters to the Korean crown prince. Khubilai, who became khan of the Mongols and emperor of China in 1260, did not impose direct rule over most of Goryeo. In contrast to Song China, Goryeo Korea was treated more like an Inner Asian power. The dynasty was allowed to survive, and intermarriage with Mongols was encouraged, even with the Mongol imperial family. At the same time, marriage between the Chinese and Mongols was strictly forbidden when the Song dynasty ended. Some military officials who refused to surrender formed the Sambyeolcho Rebellion and resisted in the islands off the southern shore of the Korean Peninsula.

Mongol Invasions of Japan
In 1266, Kublai Khan dispatched emissaries several times to Japan, demanding that Japan become a vassal and send tribute under the threat of conflict, some through Goryeo Emissaries but the Kamakura shogunate despite the Japanese Imperial Court's request for compromise rejected them. The Mongols forced Goryeo to build warships to invade Japan, using their country as a stepping stone to conquer Japan through Kyushu, Tsushima, and their surrounding islands.

First Invasion
The Yuan invasion force was composed of 15,000 Mongol, Han Chinese, and Jurchen soldiers, 6,000 to 8,000 Korean troops, and  7,000 Korean sailors. While the defending Japanese forces comprise 4,000 to 6,000 Japanese. They engaged the Japanese in conquering Tsushima, Iki Islands, and made landfall at Hakata Bay beginning the Battle of Bun'ei. After landing in the bay, the Yuan force quickly overran the town of Hakata (now a ward of Fukuoka), but were engaged by several samurai soon afterward.

At first, the Yuan and Korean forces outnumbered the samurai, who were accustomed to smaller-scale clan rivalries; they could not match the organization and massed firepower of the invaders. Yuan forces fought with precision, losing heavy volleys of arrows into the ranks of the Japanese. The Yuan also employed an early form of rocket artillery, and their infantry used phalanx-like tactics, holding off the samurai with their shields and spears. Though unable to defeat the Yuan forces conclusively, the Japanese fought hard and inflicted heavy casualties.

The Mongols burned Hakozaki Shrine to the ground during the day's fighting.

Despite their initial victories, the Yuan did not pursue the further samurai inland to the defenses at Dazaifu.   Nihon Ōdai Ichiran explains that the Mongols lost due to their limited supply of arrows.

More likely, this resulted from their unfamiliarity with the terrain, the expectation of Japanese reinforcements, and the heavy losses already suffered. The Yuan forces, which may have intended to carry out a survey in force rather than an immediate invasion, returned to their ships.  That night, the Yuan lost roughly one-third of its force in a typhoon. They retreated to Korea, presumably at the prodding of their sailors and captains, rather than regrouping and continuing their attack.

Second Invasion
More than 1,500 ships were requisitioned for the invasion: 600 from Southern China, 900 from Korea. Reportedly 40,000 troops were amassed in Korea and 100,000 in Southern China. Those numbers are likely an exaggeration, but the addition of Southern Chinese resources probably meant the second invasion force was still several times larger than the first invasion. Nothing is known about the size of the Japanese forces.

By June 1281, 900 Yuan ships were gathered in Korea; the force was called the Eastern Route Army. They were crewed by 17,000 sailors, and transported 10,000 Korean soldiers and 15,000 Mongols and Chinese. The Southern Route Army, meanwhile, was assembled just south of the Yangtze River, in China. It is said to have consisted of 100,000 men on 3,500 ships. As before, Iki and Tsushima islands fell quickly to the much larger Yuan forces beginning the Battle of Kōan.

The Eastern Route Army arrived at Hakata Bay on June 23, and decided to proceed with the invasion without waiting for the larger Southern force which had still not left China. They were a short distance to the north and east of where their force had landed in 1274, and were in fact beyond the walls and defenses constructed by the Japanese. The samurai responded quickly, assaulting the invaders with waves of defenders, denying them the beachhead.

At night small boats carried small bands of samurai into the Yuan fleet in the bay. Under cover of darkness they boarded enemy ships, killed as many as they could, and withdrew before dawn. This harassing tactic led the Yuan forces to retreat to Tsushima, where they would wait for the Southern Route Army. However, over the course of the next several weeks, 3,000 men were killed in close quarters combat in the hot weather. Yuan forces never gained a beachhead.

The first of the Southern force ships arrived on July 16, and by August 12 the two fleets were ready to attack Japan. On August 15 a major tempest struck the Tsushima Straits, lasting two full days and destroying most of the Yuan fleet. Contemporary Japanese accounts indicate that over 4,000 ships were destroyed in the storm; 80% of the Yuan soldiers either drowned or were killed by samurai on the beaches. The loss of ships was so great that "a person could walk across from one point of land to another on a mass of wreckage".

Independence
Gongmin regained Goryeo's Independence in the mid 14th century, and afterward Generals Choe Yeong and Yi Seong-gye rose to prominence with victories over invading Red Turban armies from the north and Wokou marauders from the south.

Repelling the Yuan
King Gongmin was forced to spend many years at the Yuan court, being sent there in 1341 as a virtual prisoner before becoming king. He married the Mongol princess Queen Noguk. In the mid-14th century, the Yuan dynasty was beginning to crumble due to the Red Turban Rebellion. He used the conflict to reform the Korean government, abolish Mongolian military outposts, purge pro-Yuan sentiments, and regain lost northern territories such as Liaoyang. The Goryeo army retook these provinces partly thanks to defection from Yi Jachun, a minor Korean official in service of Mongols in Ssangseong, and his son Yi Seonggye. In addition, Generals Yi Seonggye and Ji Yongsu led a campaign into Liaoyang and conquered it in 1356. The final attempt by the Yuan to dominate Goryeo failed when General Choe Yeong defeated an invading Mongol tumen in 1364.

Red Turban Rebellion
The Red Turbans attacked Goryeo, most likely because of military necessity. In December 1359, part of the Red Turban army moved their base to the Liaodong Peninsula. However, they were experiencing a shortage of war materials and lost their withdrawal route to the Chinese mainland. The Red Turban army led by Mao Ju-jing invaded Goryeo and took the city of Pyongyang. In January 1360, the Goryeo army led by An U and Yi Bang-sil retook Pyongyang and the northern region that the enemy had captured. Of the Red Turban army that had crossed the Yalu River, only 300 troops returned to Liaoning after the war. In November 1360, the Red Turban troops invaded Goryeo's northwest border with 200,000 troops again, and they occupied Gaegyeong, the capital of Goryeo, for a short period, King Gongmin escaped to Andong. However, Generals Choe Yeong, Yi Seonggye (later Taejo of Joseon), Jeong Seun and Yi Bang-sil repulsed the Red Turban army. Sha Liu and Guan Xiansheng, who were Red Turban generals, were killed in the battles. The Goryeo army continually chased their enemy and repelled them from the Korean Peninsula.

Wokou Raids
The Mongol Invasions reduced the coastal defense capabilities of Goryeo, and the Wokou Pirates gradually intensified their looting on the coasts of Goryeo. Jeong Mong-ju was dispatched to Japan to deal with the problem, and during his visit Kyushu governor Imagawa Sadayo suppressed the early wokou, later returning their captured property and people to Korea.

According to Korean records, Wako pirates were particularly rampant roughly from 1350. After almost annual invasions of the southern provinces of Jeolla and Gyeongsang, they migrated northwards to the Chungcheong and Gyeonggi areas. The History of Goryeo has a record of sea battles in 1380 whereby one hundred warships were sent to Jinpo to rout Japanese pirates there, releasing 334 captives, Japanese sorties decreasing then after. The Wako pirates were effectively expelled through gunpowder technology, which the Wako lacked after Goryeo founded the Office of Gunpowder Weapons in 1377 (but abolished twelve years later).
During the 1380s, Goryeo turned its attention to the Wokou menace and used naval artillery created by Choe Mu-seon to annihilate hundreds of pirate ships.

Winhan Retreat and Fall
In 1388, King U (son of King Gongmin and a concubine,) and general Choe Yeong planned a campaign to invade present-day Liaoning of China. King U put General Yi Seong-gye (later Taejo) in charge. Still, he stopped at the border and retreated from Wihwando to defeat Choe Yeong and overthrow the king; he replaced and put to death the last three Goryeo kings, usurped the throne, and established in 1392 the Joseon dynasty, bringing an end to 474 years of Goryeo rule on the Korean Peninsula.

Organization
In the beginning, Goryeo relied heavily on the private armies of the powerful local clans. However, its military system was gradually expanded into a centrally controlled system. It was a dual system of a professional regular army, and mandatory reserve forces was adopted to cope with such military situations. People were enlisted in the military registry regardless of sex and age, and all the men between 16 and 60 years of age were conscribed if necessary. Therefore, a minimal regular military force was maintained by each province, enabling people to carry on with their lives, and people were mobilized only during an emergency.

The two corps (gun) and the six battalions (wi) were established in the capital area, while the corps called Juhyeon or Jujin were formed in local areas. The two corps (gun) and the six battalions (wi) had a total of 45 units (yeong), with each unit consisting of 1,000 soldiers. The commanders of the central army constituted Jungbang, a council of generals. The juhyeon corps in the countryside consisted of peasants. The jujin corps at the frontier, Yanggye, were standing armies.

Ministry of War
The Ministry of War (Byeongjo,,) was an administrative agency of Goryeo. It is an institution in charge of national defense. Before King Seongjong of Goryeo, the name Byeonggwan was used, and after King Seongjong of Goryeo, it was renamed Byeongbu. Then, during the Yuan dynasty, it was changed to military service and merged into a seonbu. It was returned to Byeongbu during King Gongmin, then switched back to Gunbusa and Choongbu, and it was only renamed Byeongjo during King Gongyang. He was in charge of national defense, including operational planning, production and management of weapons, and personnel rights of military personnel. He was also in charge of transportation, such as carts and horses, communication methods, such as beacon fires and stations, and palace security.

Royal Guard
The Jung-gun of the three guns under King Taejo during the early days of Goryeo became the origin of the military. It wasn't until King Hyeonjong introduced the 2-gun system as the central army's military unit. When Kitan invaded Goryeo in 1010 (Ist year of King Hyeonjong), Hyeonjong took refuge in Naju, but he still felt threatened because there were only a few royal guards. After a few years, in 1014 (5th year of King Hyeonjong), Kim Hun, Choi Jil, and various others triggered a political upheaval, and the King planned to reinforce elite guards for his safety. There were already 6-Ui in the central army, but the King established a higher ranking 2-gun elite guard unit. The 2-gun refers to Eungyang-gun and Yongho-gun. They were the King's royal elite guards during the early days of Goryeo. The soldiers affiliated with the 2-gun were called Gunbansijok, and they enlisted in the army for management. It was a form of professional soldier position receiving wages from the government, passed on to descendants by succession.

The 2-gun's duty was to escort the King and protect the royal palace. Hengyang-gun consisted of a single regiment, and Yongho-gun was composed of two and three regiments. One regiment was the fundamental military unit of the Gore era, which consisted of 1,000 soldiers. In other words, the 2-gun consisted of 3,000 soldiers. This figure is minuscule compared to the 6-Ui, which comprises 42 regiments. However, the soldiers affiliated with the 2-gun were very close to the King, which allowed them to attain significant political growth compared to other ordinary positions. The King assigned a Sangjanggun and Daejanggun to each Gun. Sangjanggun, the commanding officer of Eungyang-gun, was the highest ranking position and was appointed as the chairperson of the Jungbang, which was the highest conference organization of Muban, the military nobility. The King also assigned military personnel of general status as the commanding officer of each regiment. Jungnangjang, Nangjang, Byeonjang, Sangwon, 5-ui, Daejeong, etc., were subordinate to each commanding officer.

Central Army
The army under King Taejo in the early days of Gore was composed of soldiers directly subordinate to Taejo, military units of Taebong, and influential regional clans. These individual groups were reorganized as an official national military organization known as the central army. In 936 (19th year of Taejo), when waging the unification war against Sin Geom's army of Post Baekje, Goryeo's military comprised Junggun, Jwagang, and Ugang. The royal elite guards are assumed to have formed the Junggun, and all other soldiers formed the parent of the 6-Wi. 6-Wi is believed to have been installed around 995 (the 14th year of King Seongjong), which is the year when the central and regional governments were reorganized. The government reorganization also led to the reorganization of the military organization. The reorganization of the military disbanded the soldiers from regional clans; it was also for the central army to assemble all the country's soldiers under the king's command. Then, amendments were applied in 998 (1st year of King Mokjong) to make 6-Wi and JaeWi eligible to receive Jeonsigwa (a minor). Before the amendments, 6-Wi was reorganized to lay the economic foundations of the affiliated soldiers.

6-Wi, the central army organization, refers to Jwau-Wi, Sinho-Wi, HeungWi-Wi, Geumo-Wi, Cheonu-Wi, and Gammun-Wi. The central army, composed of 2-gun and 6-Wi, consisted of 45,000 soldiers, of which 42,000 were affiliated with the 6-Wi. The main forces of the 6-Wi were Jwau-Wi, Sinho-Wi, and HeungWi-Wi, 32,000 soldiers were enlisted in the 3-Wi. The 3-Wi comprised 32 regiments of the overall 42 regiments, and each regiment consisted of 1,000 soldiers, meaning that there were 32,000 soldiers in the 3-Wi. It accounts for over 70% of the entire central army (45,000). The mentioned 3-Wi were also called SamWi to distinguish them from the others. They were the main forces of the central army. They were responsible for escorting the king as well as foreign ambassadors. They took part in major national events. The remaining 3-Wi were summoned according to the needs of their function. Geumo-Wi was a police unit responsible for ensuring public safety in the capital. Cheonu-Wi was the honor guard serving the king, and Gammun-Wi was assigned to watch duties at the gates of the capital city.

Provincial Army

Northern Provinces
A regional military organization was installed in the Yanggye region during the early Goryeo period. The northern border region during the Goryeo period consisted of Bukgye and Donggye, collectively called Yanggye. Military camps were installed in the Yanggye region because it was an administrative region with military solid traits. The troops stationed in the military camps at Yanggye were called Jujin-gun, Regional policies were organized during the time of King Seongjong. and the organization of Jujin-gun was also implemented. Strongholds surrounded each military base, and Jujin-gun was responsible for regional defense duties. The subjects of Jujin-gun consisted mainly of farmers and local officials who were also a part of Jujin-gun.

Jujin-gun consisted of more diverse army branches than the Juhyeon -gun in Namdo region, and they were more significant in number as well, soldiers of Bukgye consisted of Chogun, Jeongyong. Jwagun, Ugun, Bochang and Singi, Boban, Baekjeong, etc. Donggye consisted of Chogun, Jwagun, Ugun, Youngsae, and Gongjang. Jeonjang, Tuhwa, Saengcheongun, Sagong, etc. Also, in Seogyeong (Pyongyang in the present day), a military unit composed of naval forces and Wonjoengyangbangunhaninjabnyu was installed. Among them, Chogun (Jeongyong), Jwagun, Ugun, Bochang, Youngsae, etc., formed the primary military force of Jujin-gun. They were a standing army, ready for the battle.

There were 40,000 soldiers in the Bukgye region, and 11,000 soldiers in the Donggye region, Also, Singi, Boban, Gongjang of Baekjeong and Donggye, Jeonjang. Tuhwa, Saengcheongun, Sagong. etc., assisted the primary combat unit.
The total number of troops amounted to roughly 75,000 men. The military power of Yanggye amounted to roughly 140,000, including all the commanding officers.

Bangeosa, the region's minister, and Jinjang, the district's leaders, commanded Yanggye's military organization. They were responsible for the regional administrative duties and managed the military affairs with Minjeong. Commissioned officers of ranks between Jungnangjang and Daejeong directly commanded Jujingun. These men had significant influence over the settling in the Yanggye region. The chief commanding officer of the standing army of each military camp was called Doryeong. Jungnangjang or Nangjang was appointed as the Doryeong depending on the scale of the competent Jujingun. Each Doryeong was subordinate to the Bangeosa or Jinjang, responsible for the overall military administration duties. The Bangeosa and Jinjang were subordinate to Byeongmasa, the chief commander of Yanggye Jujingun. Jujingun gradually collapsed due to battles waged against the Mongolians. Mongolian invasions seized most military camps, and Yanggye's military organization gradually collapsed.

Southern Provinces
A regional military organization was installed in 5 southern provinces and Gyeonggi during the early Goryeo period. During the early days of Goryeo, Juhyeon-gun system was established by organizing troops subordinate to regional clans and people under their influence as a military organization. Gwanggun, was found as a defense against Kitan's invasions during King Jeongjong and Jinsugun. They were dispatched to various regions during the early days of the nation's establishment, where the origin of the Juhyeon-gun was. The regional systems established during King Seongjong and Hyeonjong were reorganized, and a regional military organization was newly formed. Juhyeon-gun organization is assumed to have been established around 1018 (9th year of King Hyeonjong). Juhyeon-gun was a military organization that allocated military units in the five provinces of Gyeonggi and within Gyeonggi territory.
The military units were formed by assigning regional administrative districts centered on Ju, bu, Gun, and Hyeon, to which provincial officials were posted, Juhyeon-gun was composed of Boseung, Jeongyong, and Ipum, Boseunggun consisted of 8,601 soldiers, Jeongyong-gun 19,745 soldiers, and Ipumgun 19,882 soldiers. The total military power amounted to 48,237 soldiers. Also, there was a 2,3 pumgun composed of farmers that provided support. The main force of Juhyeon-gun were Boseung and Jeongyong. 'They were mainly deployed into battles and took the responsibility of border defense in yearly rotations. Ipumgun was a labor unit in charge of general public military duties. The majority of Juhyeon-gun was deployed for significant battles. Juhyeon-gun mainly consisted of local farmers regarded as competent to fulfill military obligations, and local officials were also subject to enlistment. Regional and local officials or commissioned officers were appointed to command Juhyeon-gun, Juhyeon-gun system remained active until a full-fledged war against the Mongolians broke loose. The organization gradually collapsed as the war persisted for an extended period, and it became systematically challenging to support them, Juhyeon-gun disappeared during the latter days of the battle against the Mongolians.

Navy
The Goryeo government never established a naval system, but there was a government official for naval forces (Sasu-si,,) as part of the Ministry of War. However, since it was installed in 1390 (the 2nd year of King Gongyang), at the end of the Goryeo period, it wasn't significant and did not affect the Goryeo dynasty. The government established the Seonbyeongdo Department (Seonbyeongdobuseo,,) in areas where pirates frequently invaded or required maritime security.

Seonbyeongdo Department
The Seonbyeongdo Department is a naval corps that defeats or captures pirates' ships, captures or beheads pirates, repatriates drifters, etc. The mission of the Seonbyeongdo department was to defend and guard the sea as the main force of the navy. The Seonbyeongdo Departments were in the Jinmyeong, Wonheung, Donggye, Tongju, and Apgang administrative districts in the Northern (Bukgye) and Southern (Namhae) regions. The official positions of the department were the Admiral (Seonbyeongbyeolgam,,), Commander (Sa,,
()), Deputy Commander (Busa,,), and Master-at-arms (Panwon,()), but they were not uniform. The government also established Seonbyeongdo Department when needed rather than permanently for a certain period. A military magistrate respectively commanded the northern seas, and governors controlled those in the southern seas (Anchalsa,,.

In the early Goryeo period, the pirates from the Eastern Jurchens (Dong Yeojin, (()), who frequently invaded the East Coastal Region, were defeated by the naval forces in the Seonbyeongdo department during the winter season. The naval forces in the Seonbyeongdo department in the Northern Regions fought foreign enemies such as Khitan and the Jurchens. During Yejong's reign, General Yun-Gwan led 2,600 naval forces from the Seonbyeongdo department in a winter's conquest against the Jurchens as they were active in Dorinpo County. In 1275 (the 15th year of King Wonjong), they invaded Japan with the Mongols, consisting of 5,300 Goryeo soldiers, 900 Byeongseon ships transporting carriers (chogong,,) of great millets (Susu,,) participated in the war. In 1281 (the 7th year of King Chungnyeol), during the 2nd Japanese conquest, at the request of the Mongols, 900 battleships, 15,000 provincial soldiers, 10,000 regular soldiers, and 110,000 straw sacks (seog) were prepared, but there was not much different from the number in the actual expedition as the carriers for the millets comprise a part of the naval force.

At the end of the Goryeo period, the Wokou were plundered, murdered, and arson in the coastal and inland areas. General Jeong Ji, who insisted on fostering naval forces, became Marshal of Haedo and defeated Japanese ships in Jinpo County, Gunsan Island, etc. General Park Wi made great achievements, such as conquering Tsushima, the den of Wokous, and burning 300 Japanese ships with 100 battleships, showing that naval activity was very active in the late Goryeo period. However, the records of the late Goryeo period do not show the Seonbyeongdo department's activities, as the government abolished the department in the late Goryeo period.

Ships
Korean shipbuilding again excelled during the Goryeo Dynasty. The two main ships that served in the early period navy were the Gwaseon, (spear vessel, (() and the Daenuseon (pavilion ship, ((). The Daenuseon was a large military vessel with a large pavilion and two masts used by King Taejo in naval battles during the unification of the later three kingdoms. In 1010, Goryeo shipbuilders developed the Gwaseon; the ship was designed to sail fast and ram and destroy Japanese and Jurchen pirate vessels that were attacking Korean coastal cities with spears attached to the bow.

Two main ships served in the late navy, the Nujeonseon (tower ship,, and the Pyeongjeonseon (flat ship,. The Nujeonseon and the Pyeongjeonseon were warships built to protect against Wokou Raids during the Goryeo Dynasty, and they participated in the Invasion of Japan. These warships were large enough to carry 200 or more fighting marines. They're also robust in size and durability and have flat-hulls to withstand the Kamikaze. When the Wokou raided Goryeo, Choe Museon outfitted them with cannons and rocket launchers. Choe's objective was to sink and burn the Woku fleet from long distances to prevent them from boarding. The Nujeonseon deck comprises four cannons and two rocket launchers, two cannons and one rocket launcher on each side. The Pyeongjeonseon deck contains four guns and six rocket launchers, two cannons, and three rocket launchers on each side. However, there are instances where these two ships could carry up to ten guns and eight rocket launchers each, as their flat-bottomed hulls would allow the vessel to fire with less recoil.

Equipment

Armor
Following the collapse of United Silla in the 10th century and its takeover by Goryeo, the warfare style more familiar to the Central and Northern parts of Korea, along with the use of lighter armor inspired by the Song Dynasty, took over. This resulted in the general abandonment of the heavy armor typically used by the southern states. 

During the early Goryeo-era, the army and navy wore the durumagi, chainmail armor (swaejagab), and lamellar armor (jalgap) up until the early Joseon period in the 15th century. They wore helmets such as the wide-brim helmets and winged helmets influenced by the Song Dynasty, which they sometimes had neck defenses of lamellar. The opponents of Goryeo weren't heavily armored soldiers of other Korean states anymore. The trend shifted towards armor that made units mobile and responsive to a conflict with nomadic Mongolic or semi-nomadic and sedentary Tungusic tribes to the North. 

Lamellar armor is a traditional Korean armor used by the militaries of the Three Kingdoms Period. Its body armor reaches down to the thighs or knees. Archers and infantry wore lamellar that covered the legs and the torso. Officers and elite soldiers also wore lamellar inspired by the Late Tang dynasty and Song Dynasty, which included a set of shoulder guards that protected the upper arm, making it a complete metallic armor set.

The durumagi was a unique type of brigandine that resembled a robe or overcoat with scale armor glued, woven, or nailed, forming dots on the outside. Though light infantry wore regular durumagi, they commonly had scales or overlapping plates made from leather, paper, or iron. Still, some of them with iron is coated with mercury or black lacquer to make them shine. The military preferred the durumagi because its open-fronted type armor made it comfortable for soldiers to use a bow. When shooting arrows, they must push the chest away to fire them accurately, but if they close the chest, they cannot fire arrows properly. They're also complete with a (winged) helmet with or without a hohaeg (()()) of lamellar inside to protect their heads and necks.

During the 13th~14th centuries, under the rule of the Mongol Empire, Goryeo armor began to see several changes to its military. The durumagi adopted elements of Mongol and Song armor; the armor resembles the standard Yuan Dynasty brigandine, comprised of a helmet assuming a conical shape, and had three brigandine neck defenses attached to the sides and back of the helmet. The lamellar armor also composes a helmet resembling European kettle hats with attached neck defenses of mail or lamellar. During the late Goryeo dynasty, the officers, elite soldiers, and cavalry of the army and marines of the navy wore mail and plate armour (gyeongbeongap).

Weapons
Goryeo’s weapons were spears, bows, and swords, inherited those of the Three Kingdoms Period and used during the unification war of the Later Three Kingdoms.

Melee
The standard Korean sword was the Hwandudaedo of the Three Kingdoms Period, during this period it lacked a pommel with the addition of a round guard. After repelling the Mongol occupation, curved swords replaced the straight blade slightly due to the Mongol's scimitar influencing the Korean sword making and Chinese weapon manufacture after Goryeo's submission as a Mongol vassal.

The soldiers and marines used the dagger-axe (Gwa (Kkeokchang)) and two-pointed spear (Mo (Tugeobchang)). In fortress battles centered on castles or against horsemen in the north, javelins and spears were more effective than other weapons. Unlike other weapons, the spear can be cut or scraped off, and the spear is also effective in cavalry battles in that it is a long-armed weapon that uses sharp blades.

Archery

They also used repeating crossbows and crossbows.

Gunpowder

The earliest possible references to firearms in Korea are to what might have been gunpowder-ignited flamethrowers in 1104 and explosive bombs in 1135. The next reference is to a cannon which fired large arrows being tested for use on the northwestern frontier in 1356.

Firearms were recognized by Goryeo military leaders as necessary for national defense. Constituting a particular threat were Japanese raiders, who frequently plundered coastal towns in increasing numbers from 1350 onward. Gunpowder and firearms explicitly for combating them on the sea were imported from China in 1374. However, Chinese government policy still restricted the necessary expertise for production.

Numerous ancient Chinese documents relating to gunpowder based weapons such as the Huolongjing were acquired by the Koreans in addition to small samples of Chinese gunpowder which the Koreans reverse engineered.

In 1373, King Gongmin visited a newly constructed fleet for use against the Wokou, including the firing of cannons. He then requested a shipment of cannon, gunpowder, and gunpowder ingredients from Ming, granted the following year. Local production did not begin until Choe Mu-seon, a minor military official, learned potassium nitrate purification methods from a visiting Chinese saltpeter merchant. After petitioning the court for several years, the Firearms Directorate was established in 1377 to oversee firearms production and development. He accomplished it between 1374 and 1376.

Choe Mu-seon, a Goryeo scientist, developed Korean cannon in the 14th century. They were soon developed to be used on Goryeo battleships and were used with success against the Mongol invasion. A government office for developing gunpowder and firearms was established in 1377, with Choe appointed its head. By 1395, several weapons were developed here and in use: a series of cannons such as the daejanggunpo, hand-cannons such as the ijanggunpo, and samjanggunpo, a shell-firing mortar called the jillyeopo, series of yuhwa, juhwa, and chokcheonhwa rockets, which were the forerunners of the singijeon, and a signal gun called the shinpo.

A fleet of ships was trained in cannon use in 1378. In 1380, the Goryeo navy had implemented widespread use of cannons on board their ships attacked and a large wako fleet off of the Geum River which resulted in the near destruction of almost the entire wako fleet. The world's first naval artillery battle took place off the coast of Korea. In the Battle of Chinpo (1380), 80 Koryo warships, equipped with firearms invented by Choi Mu-son, sank 500 Japanese Wako, or pirate ships. Also, in 1383, Admiral Jeong Ji destroyed 17 wako pirate vessels using shipboard cannons. In 1389 a total of 300 Waegu ships were damaged, and over a hundred Korean prisoners were liberated in a raid on Tsushima ordered by Yi Seonggye.
Three years later, in 1383, the Korean navy defeated the Wokou with cannon.

See Also
 Goryeo
 Military History of Korea
 Goryeo-Khitan War
 Mongol invasions of Korea
 Sambyeolcho Rebellion
 Mongol invasions of Japan
 Red Turban invasions of Goryeo
 Wihwado Retreat
 Joseon
 Joseon Army
 Joseon Navy

References

External links

Naval history of Korea
Military history of Korea
Goryeo